Nossrat Peseschkian (June 18, 1933 – April 27, 2010) lived in Germany since 1954. He was a specialist in neurology, psychiatry, psychotherapy and psychosomatic medicine. Peseschkian founded Positive Psychotherapy in 1968, based on a cross-cultural approach; he was also the founder of the Wiesbaden Academy of Psychotherapy (WIAP), a German-state-licensed, postgraduate institute of psychotherapy.

Biography
Born and raised in Iran, Nossrat Peseschkian went to Germany in 1954 for his studies in medicine at the universities of Freiburg, Frankfurt am Main and Mainz. After his medical specialization and his dissertation, he had his postgraduate training in psychotherapy in Germany, Switzerland, Austria and the United States. As an international lecturer, Peseschkian traveled to 67 countries worldwide. A global network of over 100 local, regional and national centers of Positive Psychotherapy has been established in 33 countries up to date. Most of his trainings focused on Germany, Austria, Switzerland and Luxemburg.

Peseschkian wrote 26 different psychotherapeutic books, some of them have been translated into 23 languages. The method of positive psychotherapy is a psychodynamic method with a cross-cultural and humanistic background and has been developed beginning in 1968. In 1977, the German Association for Positive Psychotherapy was founded. Internationally, Positive Psychotherapy is represented by the World Association of Positive Psychotherapy. Swiss psychiatrist Professor G. Benedetti, explained in 1979: "His model is a notable synthesis of psychodynamic and behavior-therapeutic elements, making an essential contribution to a unified relationship within psychotherapy".

Peseschkian was, up to the date of his death, the head of the International Academy for Positive and Transcultural Psychotherapy the president of the World Association for Positive Psychotherapy, and Honorary President of the German Association for Positive Psychotherapy. He was honorary professor at the National Psychoneurologic Institute Bechterew in St. Petersburg, Russia. In 1996, he received the Federal Order of Merit from the president of Germany. Peseschkian was a member of the Baháʼí Faith.

He is survived by his wife Manije Peseschkian, a family therapist, their two sons, both medical doctors in the field of psychiatry and psychotherapy (Hamid Peseschkian; Nawid Peseschkian), and four grandchildren. His grave is in Wiesbaden-Sonnenberg, and was recognized by the Wiesbaden City Council on 17 March 2023 as a grave of honor.

Publications
Amongst Peseschkian's books and publications (mostly in German, some English, Chinese and Russian and other languages) are:
If You Want Something You Never Had, Then Do Something You Never Did, by Nossrat Peseschkian, published 2006, Sterling Publishers Pvt., Limited, 
Positive Psychotherapy Theory and Practice of a New Method, by Peseschkian, Nossrat (Walker, Robert R, Dr. Translator), Publisher: Springer-Verlag, Berlin, 1987,  (first German edition 1977 by Fischer Verlag)
Oriental Stories as Tools in Psychotherapy: the Merchant and the Parrot, by Peseschkian, Nossrat, Publisher: Springer-Verlag, 1986  (first German edition 1979 by Fischer Verlag)
In Search of Meaning, by Peseschkian, Nossrat, Publisher: Springer  (first German edition 1983 by Fischer Verlag)
Positive Family Therapy, by Peseschkian, Nossrat, Publisher: Springer , republished Sterling Publishers Pvt. Ltd, India  (first German edition 1980 by Fischer Verlag)
Psychotherapy of Everyday Life: Training in Partnership and Self Help With 250 Case Histories, by Peseschkian, Nossrat, Publisher: Springer  (first German edition 1974 by Fischer Verlag)
 Positive Psychotherapy in: Globalized Psychotherapy by Alfred Pritz (Ed.), Publisher: Facultas, 2002 
 Religion and Science from the Viewpoint of the Baháʼí Faith in: Psychotherapy in East and West. Proceedings of the 16th International Congress of Psychotherapy. Publisher: Korean Academy for Psychotherapists 1994
Over 260 articles in professional journals in Germany and international academic publications.

Awards and honors
 In 1997 Nossrat Peseschkian was awarded the Richard Mertens Prize for his work, “Computer Assisted Quality Assurance in Positive Psychotherapy”. This Prize is one of the highest awards of quality assurance in the medical field in Europe.
 In 1998 the Federal Medical Chamber of Germany awarded Peseschkian the Ernst von Bergmann Plaque for Services in Continuing Medical Education for Physicians in Germany.
 In June 1998, President Prof. B.D. Karvarrarsky nominated Peseschkian as an honorary member  of the Russian Association for Psychotherapy.  The ceremony took place in Moscow.
 The Lord Mayor of the city of Santa Cruz, Bolivia, declared Peseschkian as an honorary citizen for his outstanding Postgraduate Teaching Projects at NUR University.
 The Primorsky Branch of the Russian Association of Psychotherapy honored Peseschkian in July 1999 with the “Ceramic Dolphin Prize” for Distinguished Contributions in Development of High Standard Psychotherapeutic Training in the Primorye Region of Russia.
 In 2002, upon nomination of the National Spiritual Assembly of the Baháʼís of Germany, the  Foundation Samii-Housseinpur, Belgium, awarded Peseschkian in the category of science (in recognition of his achievements).
 In January 2006, Peseschkian received the Order of Merit,  Distinguished Service Cross of the Federal Republic of Germany. (Bundesverdienstkreuz). The President of the Federal Republic of Germany, Dr. Horst Köhler,  signed the Document. "This Order is the highest recognition of the Federal Republic of Germany for those citizens who have acquired distinguished services and achievements in social-economical, political and spiritual fields as well as their particular services for the Republic for example social charity and humanitarian aid."
 In June 2006 the Association of Iranian Physicians and Dentists in Germany honored Peseschkian and two other nominees - among the Iranian Physicians - with an award of recognition for their significant scientific contribution to the field of medicine and health in the world.
 In November 2006 Peseschkian was one of the honourees of the Encyclopædia Iranica at the Geneva Gala. Encyclopædia Iranica is a branch of Columbia University in New York, United States.

Memberships in Scientific Societies

International Associations
 World Psychiatric Association
 World Council for Psychotherapy (WCP)
 International Council of Psychologists
 International Association for Cross cultural Psychology
 International Association of Group Psychotherapy
 European Association for Psychotherapy (EAP)
 International Federation of Psychotherapy (IFP)
 International College of Psychosomatic Medicine
 American Psychiatric Association
 Schweizerische Gesellschaft für psychosomatische Medizin
 Deutsch-Chinesische Gesellschaft für Medizin e.V.
 Association for Baháʼí Studies North America ABS

National Associations (Germany, Switzerland, Austria)
 Deutsche Gesellschaft für Psychiatrie, Psychotherapie und Nervenheilkunde (DGPPN)
 Deutsche Gesellschaft für Positive Psychotherapie e.V. (DGPP)
 Allgemeine Ärztliche Gesellschaft für Psychotherapie (AÄGP)
 Deutsche Gesellschaft für ärztliche Hypnose und autogenes Training
 Deutsche Gesellschaft für Neurologie
 Berufsverband Deutscher Nervenärzte Landesverband Hessen
 Bundesverband der Deutschen Schriftsteller-Ärzte e.V.
 Deutsche Arbeitsgemeinschaft für Migrantenmedizin
 Senatsmitglied Bundesverband für Wirtschaftsförderung und Außenwirtschaft

References

External links
 Positive Psychotherapy site
 International Academy site
 State Academy site (Germany)

1933 births
2010 deaths
German Bahá'ís
Iranian Bahá'ís
German people of Iranian descent
German psychotherapists
Iranian psychiatrists
Recipients of the Cross of the Order of Merit of the Federal Republic of Germany
20th-century Bahá'ís
21st-century Bahá'ís